Basic leucine zipper and W2 domain-containing protein 1 is a protein that in humans is encoded by the BZW1 gene.

Interactions 

BZW1 has been shown to interact with PSTPIP1 and CDC5L.

References

Further reading

External links